José Duarte de Almeida Ribeiro e Castro (born Lisbon, 24 December 1953) is a Portuguese lawyer and politician. He was the leader of the People's Party from 24 April 2005 to 2007, when he was replaced again by Paulo Portas. 
He was also a Member of the European Parliament (MEP) from 1999 to 2009, for the Social Democratic Party–People's Party coalition; part of the European People's Party–European Democrats group.

Education
He is a Graduate in law (Lisbon, 1975).

Politician

He was a member of Odemira Municipal Assembly (1982-1985).

EPP/ED group coordinator at the Human Rights Subcommittee in the European Parliament (since 2004).
Member and Chairman of Sintra Municipal Assembly (since 2002).
Legal adviser to the Ministry of Labour and Social Security (since 1991).
Member of the Higher Council for Social Policy of the Ministry of Social Affairs (1988–1990).
Member of the Portuguese Parliament (1976–1983 and 1999).
Adviser and assistant to the Ministry of Education (1987–1991).
Secretary of State in the Deputy Prime Minister's Office (1980 and 1981–1983).

CDS
He is a member of the National Board of the CDS party (1975–1983) and the CDS-PP (1998-2003).
Member of the CDS-PP’s National Board Executive Committee (since 2004).
Vice-Chairman of the CDS’ parliamentary group  for 1981 and CDS spokesman 1976–1983.

Career

He founded Juventude Centrista in 1974.

He worked as a legal expert and counsellor (1976–1999).

He worked in television, being a member (1988–1990), and Chairman (1990–1991), of the inspection board of RTP (Portuguese Radio and Television). Between 1991 and 1999, he held a number of managerial posts at TVI television.

He was vice-chairman of Sport Lisboa e Benfica for 1997–1998.

He is a contributor to various newspapers.

References

1957 births
Living people
People from Lisbon
Members of the Assembly of the Republic (Portugal)
MEPs for Portugal 2004–2009
MEPs for Portugal 1999–2004